Neve Tzahal is a neighborhood of Tel Aviv, Israel. It is located in the southern part of the city. The neighborhood was built 1950-1951 between Kfar Shalem and Shechunat Hatikva and originally housed military families.

References

Neighborhoods of Tel Aviv